Bowey is an English surname. Notable people with this surname include:

 Brett Bowey (born 1969), Australian football player
 Eddie Bowey (1928–2016), English wrestler
 Frank Bowey (1881–1947), Australian football player
 Madison Bowey (born 1995), Canadian ice hockey player
 Olwyn Bowey (born 1936), British artist
 Steve Bowey (born 1974), English football player